Cantalpino is a village and municipality in the province of Salamanca,  western Spain, part of the autonomous community of Castile-Leon.

The postal code is 37405.

Notable people
On 15 December 1899, Eusebia Palomino Yenes, a nun of the Salesian Sisters of Don Bosco, was born here. In 2004 she was beatified.

References

Municipalities in the Province of Salamanca